KOF: Maximum Impact 2 (KOFMI2), released in North America as The King of Fighters 2006 (KOF 2006, or KOF '06), is a 3D fighting game produced by SNK Playmore and released for the PlayStation 2 in 2006. It was also released for the arcade under the title The King of Fighters 2006: Regulation A. It is the sequel to KOF: Maximum Impact, which itself was a spinoff of The King of Fighters series.

Gameplay

Plot
Many contended that the illegal fighting tournament in Southtown was sponsored by the gangland syndicate "Mephistopheles" to achieve the annihilation of their rivals and procure some operating capital. After its "King," Duke, suffered defeat at the hands of Alba Meira in the finals, he and his organization vanished from Southtown. Meanwhile, the media, firmly under Duke's control, released a fusillade of sensational exposés based on information from confidential sources  regarding their former oppressors. In spite of this new torrent of "information,"  almost no one knew that an even larger entity had been pulling Mephistopheles' puppet strings.

The truth behind the Addes organization name was only known throughout the dark recesses of the underworld. No one really had an inkling as to what this organization truly entailed. Now, another of Addes was to reveal a new battle royale. Invitations in white envelopes were sent to the world's mightiest, who will find the call to the battle by Addes irresistible.

As stated in Alba Meira's private novel by Akihiko Ureshino on the official KOF Maximum Impact 2 site (which serves as an official follow up to the story of KOF Maximum Impact 2), Alba was in fact the one who defeated Jivatma and Luise. Soiree was kidnapped as a result of that and Alba has not seen him since then.

Characters
The game features 24 initially selectable characters, as well as 14 secret characters (including the final boss), for a total of 38 playable characters.

Returning Characters:

 Alba Meira
 Soiree Meira
 Kyo Kusanagi (with new outfit)
 Iori Yagami
 Terry Bogard
 Rock Howard
 Ryo Sakazaki
 Yuri Sakazaki
 Mignon Beart
 Leona Heidern

 Ralf Jones
 Clark Still
 K′
 Maxima
 Mai Shiranui
 Athena Asamiya
 Chae Lim
 Lien Neville
 Seth
 Duke

New Characters:

 Luise Meyrink
 Nagase
 Billy Kane
 Kula Diamond
 Bonne Jenet: Hidden Character

 Kim Kaphwan: Hidden Character
 Ninon Beart: Hidden Character
 Hyena: Hidden Character
 Richard Meyer: Hidden character
 Nightmare Geese (his Real Bout Fatal Fury Special Incarnation); hidden character
 Lilly Kane (Billy's sister): Hidden Character
 Fiolina Germi (from the Metal Slug series): Hidden Character

Alternate Hidden Characters:
 Kyo Kusanagi Classic – Kyo Kusanagi with a moveset based on KOF '95, and is wearing his outfit from the Orochi and NESTS saga.
 Wild Wolf – Terry Bogard's Garou: Mark of the Wolves version.
 Mr. Karate II – Ryo Sakazaki's Buriki One version.
 Armor Ralf – A version of Ralf who doesn't flinch when hit, and whose attacks do greatly increased guard damage. According to his backstory, he is wearing some experimental armour he was originally hesitant to use.
 Hanzo Hattori – From Samurai Shodown, he shares most of his moves (and a special intro) with Nagase. According to his backstory, he met Jivatma once in the past.

Final boss
 Jivatma – As Duke lost the match to Alba in the last Tournament, Jivatma runs this Tournament for Addes, but after his defeat in the Tournament by Alba Meira he takes Soiree with him.
Story Mode Default Character Stages: 

• War memorial- Soiree, Mignon, Clark, Maxima

• Temple of Ruins - Alba, Nagese, Athena

• Hunting Cave - Lien, Ralf, Leona

• Sacred Garden - Luise

• Tower Festival - Kyo, Billy, Seth, Terry

• Catacomb - Mai, Kula, K'

• Kyokugen Dojo - Ryo, Yuri, Chae Lim

• Feur-De-Lis - Rock, Duke, Iori

• Grand Mosque - Jivatma

Revisions

Regulation A
An update to Maximum Impact 2, it was released for the Taito Type X2 arcade system in July 2007. It is the only arcade release made for the KOF: MI series and includes Ash Crimson, Blue Mary, Makoto Mizoguchi from Data East's Fighter's History series, and newcomer Xiao Lon, who is a Hizoku Assassin like her agnate brother, Duo Lon, into its character roster. Regulation "A" is a remake of Maximum Impact 2, but with the classic 3-on-3 gameplay from the 2D KOF series added in hopes of winning over the series fanbase as well as new players.

Despite the addition of four new characters, Armor Ralf has been removed, as have several stages, as well as the story and challenge modes from Maximum Impact 2. In addition, all of the characters have lost half of their outfits in both normal and alternate types. Some new music has been added, including songs from the original Maximum Impact and Sengoku 3, in addition to new alternate versions of existing stages and a new stage for Makoto Mizoguchi.

The game was also released for the PlayStation 2 in Japan, on July 26, 2007. It was planned for release in the U.S. along with RA2, but was cancelled due to the timing of KOF XII.

Regulation A2
A sequel to KOF: Maximum Impact Regulation "A" was announced for the PlayStation 2 and Taito Type X2 at the Tokyo Game Show 2007. Many believed that the game was put on hold due to the development of The King of Fighters XII, but it was later canceled.

The King of Fighters: Another Day
The King of Fighters: Another Day is an animated series based on the popular fighting game series The King of Fighters. It was produced and animated by Production I.G, and revolves around the plot of KOF: Maximum Impact, along with some touches of the current storyline about Ash Crimson, who joined the MI gang in the arcade game, The King of Fighters: Maximum Impact Regulation "A". The ONA series was included with the Japanese release of Maximum Impact 2.

Reception

The game was nominated to the "PSXE's 2006 Game of the Year Awards" in the category Best Fighting Game, but it lost to Tekken 5: Dark Resurrection. Greg Kasavin from GameSpot ranked the game as good, giving it a score of 7.3 over 10. He commented while the game was highly improved from its prequel, it had many issues. Use of 3D graphics, although being praised too for being "good in most cases", did not make changes to fights in comparison to 2D games from the series. However, he praised the variability of playable characters with different moves as well as their alternative costumes. 1Up.com reviewer Richard Li rated the game as B+. He also praised the use of alternative costumes, commenting they "make even the most seasoned fan chuckle." He praised the mechanics from fights by saying they are much better from the first Maximum Impact, allowing the players to use new tactics to defeat his/her opponent.

The game sold 56,431 units in Japan.

References

External links
KOF: Maximum Impact 2 at the official Japanese website of SNK Playmore
KOF: Maximum Impact Regulation "A" official website

2006 video games
3D fighting games
The King of Fighters games
PlayStation 2 games
PlayStation Network games
Arcade video games
Fighting games
Video games developed in Japan
SNK Playmore games
RenderWare games
UTV Ignition Games games
Multiplayer and single-player video games
Crossover fighting games